Vegetarian and vegan dietary practices vary among countries. Differences include food standards, laws, and general cultural attitudes toward vegetarian diets.
	
In some instances, vegetarians that choose to abstain from dairy may be labeled as vegan. However, veganism typically refers to abstaining from any act that may directly or indirectly injure any sentient being, thus typically requiring the exclusion of eggs and often honey, along with dairy, as well as further non-dietary exclusions such as the purchase of wool and leather.

The concept of vegetarianism to indicate 'vegetarian diet' is first mentioned by the Greek philosopher and mathematician Pythagoras of Samos around 500 BCE. Followers of several religions such as Buddhism, Hinduism, and Jainism also advocated vegetarianism, and believed that humans should not inflict pain on other animals.

Some countries have strong cultural or religious traditions that promote vegetarianism, such as India, while other countries have secular ethical concerns, including animal rights, environmental protection, and health concerns. In many countries, food labeling laws make it easier for vegetarians to identify foods compatible with their diets.

In January 2022, Google revealed that searches for "vegan food near me" have dramatically increased in 2021 and attributed it to "breakthrough status", meaning it increased by 5,000 percent or more indicating the rising popularity of vegan diets.

Demographics 

The percentages in the following table estimates prevalence of dietary vegetarianism and dietary veganism. The distinction is important between dietary vegans and other vegans. Dietary vegans may use leather or other non-food animal products, while other vegans (sometimes called lifestyle or ethical vegans) use no animal products of any type.

Africa 
According to a Nielsen survey, the Africa/Middle East region (of which Egypt, Morocco, Pakistan, Saudi Arabia, South Africa, United Arab Emirates were surveyed), has 16% vegetarians and 6% vegans, making it the second-most vegetarian region after Asia.

Eastern
Vegan dishes are commonplace in Ethiopian cuisine due to mandates by the Ethiopian Orthodox Church and Egyptian Coptic Christianity that require weekly fasting days (fasting in this context is abstaining from all meat products).

As the majority of the population of Mauritius is Hindu, vegetarianism is common and vegetarian cuisine is widely available in restaurants.

Northern
Countries in North Africa have a tradition of cooking in a vegetarian style, with Morocco, Algeria, Libya and Tunisia being particularly connected with this type of cooking which includes couscous and spiced vegetables.

Southern
Hindu and Jain immigrants from India brought vegetarianism with them. This trend has been documented as far back as 1895 in Natal Province.

Asia
Of five world regions, the Asia-Pacific region has the highest share of vegetarians (19%) and vegans (9%).

Eastern

China 

In China, a small but growing number of young people is getting to become vegan in the large cities. An estimated 4 to 5 percent of Chinese are vegetarian.

Chinese folk religion, which is distinct from Taoism, Chinese salvationist religions, and New Religious Movements is similar to Shintoism in Japan insofar as while the killing and eating of animals is not forbidden, it is considered impure and not ideal for practicing. Tofu, soy milk, and seitan, which are popular among vegetarians in the world, originated in China.

Classical Chinese texts pointed to a period of abstinence from meat before undertaking matters of great importance or of religious significance. People typically abstain from meat periodically, particularly the day before Chinese New Year. Although it is more common among adherents of Chinese folk religions, many secular people also do this.

Ancient China was once known for having profound veganism in its food culture. Its widespread vegetarianism originally comes from the Buddhist code (Vinaya) transferred from ancient India which valued not killing animals. With the influx of Buddhist influences, vegetarianism became more popular, but there is a distinction—Taoist vegetarianism is based on a perception of purity, while Buddhist vegetarianism is based on the dual bases of refraining from killing and subduing one's own subservience to the senses.  Because of this, two types of "vegetarianism" came to be—one where one refrained from eating meat, the other being refraining from eating meat as well as garlic, onions, and other such strongly flavored foods.  This Buddhism-influenced vegetarianism has been known and practiced by some since at least the 7th century. People who are Buddhist may also avoid eating eggs. 

The early 20th century saw some intellectuals espousing vegetarianism as part of their program for reforming China culturally, not just politically. The anarchist thinker Li Shizeng, for instance, argued that tofu and soy products were healthier and could be a profitable export. Liang Shuming, a philosopher and reform activist, adopted a basically vegetarian diet, but did not promote one for others. In recent years, it has seen a resurgence in the cities among the emerging middle class.

Japan

In Japan, it was considered normal to have meat in daily diet. But after Buddhism arrived to the country, the emperor at that time made a law in 675 AC to restrict people from eating cows, horses, dogs, monkeys and chickens. This change is assumed to be a contributor to the spread of 精進料理 (Shôjin Ryôri), a type of meals that is still eaten at contemporary Buddhist temples. 

Even though shôjin ryôrii is often assumed the same as vegetarian, it has its roots in religion, and the word shôjin ryôrii refers to the different ways of cooking and table manners that differ by religious branches, not only it being vegetarian meals. Some of the differences between vegetarian foods and shôjin ryôrii is that the usage of onions, garlics, or herbs and vegetables that have strong smells is avoided in addition to the avoidance of meat, and this is because consumption of those foods is believed to prevent one from focusing in Buddhist practices.

South Korea
According to The Food and Beverage News, vegetarianism grew from over 7,000 in 2015 to nearly 30,000 in 2019, and many converted due to health reasons. Some of the popular reasons for changing their diet are ethical concerns, environmental protection concerns, and to lose weight. 

A study by the Korean Agro-Fisheries and Food Trade Corporation found that from a study of 5,510 respondents, 418 people followed a diet that refrained from eating meat. From the statistic, 79.7% of them identified as flexitarians (those who eat meat rarely), 11% of them identified as pollotarians and pescatarians  (those who still eat poultry but no other meats, and those who still eat fish but no meats), and 6% of them are vegetarians. 

With the addition of Beyond Meat and other plant-based meat alternatives hit the shelves of the world. Lotte Mart, a Korean grocery store, noticed the growth in the popularity of meat alternatives. They then produced an alternative to meat called Gogi Dasein, which translates to “instead of meat.”

Taiwan

There are more than 6,000 vegetarian eating establishments in Taiwan. The country's food labelling laws for vegetarian food are the world's strictest, because it has been estimated that more than 3 million Taiwanese people eat vegetarian food, which accounts for approximately 13% of the national population.
A popular movement of "one day vegetarian every week" has been advocated on a national level. Also, on a local level, even government bodies are involved, such as the Taipei City Board of Education.
Vegetarian food can be found in meals served on the Taiwan High Speed Rail, Taiwan Railways Administration, major Taiwanese airlines, as well as highway stops.

Southern

India

Prevalence of vegetarianism 
In 2007, UN FAO statistics indicated that Indians had the lowest rate of meat consumption in the world. Some vegetarians in India have been demanding meat-free supermarkets. In Indian cuisine, vegetarianism is usually synonymous with lacto vegetarianism. Most restaurants in India clearly distinguish themselves as being either "non-vegetarian", "vegetarian", or "pure vegetarian" or "Jain vegetarian" depending upon location, chef/staff, ingredients used and items served.  With non-vegetarian and vegetarian being self-explanatory, pure vegetarian refers to hotels run by vegetarian staff, owners subscribing to lacto-vegetarianism including avoidance of indirect animal ingredients like rennet, collagen while Jain vegetarian refers to food subscribing to Jain standards. Some restaurants cater to Eggetarians who are lacto-ovo-vegetarians. Vegetarian restaurants abound, and many vegetarian options are usually available.

Animal-based ingredients (other than milk and honey) such as lard, gelatin, and meat stock are not used in their traditional cuisine. India has devised a system of marking edible products made from only vegetarian ingredients, with a green dot in a square with a green outline. A new mark of a red triangle in a square with a red outline conveys that some animal-based ingredients (meat, egg, etc.) were used, since 2021. Earlier a mark of a red circle in a square with a red outline used to be used. This was replaced due to issues faced by people with colour blindness in distinguishing between the marks. Products like honey, milk, or its direct derivatives are categorized under the green mark.

It is noted that, in states where vegetarianism is more common, milk consumption is higher and is associated with lactase persistence. This allows people to continue consuming milk into adulthood and obtain proteins that are substituted for meat, fish and eggs in other areas.

Connection of vegetarianism and Hinduism 

Vegetarianism and Hinduism share a deep connection with each other. Hinduism believes that the soul has no beginning and an end, but it is a perpetual cycle through endless rebirth and deaths until the soul can reach the Brahman, the One God. However, only people can attain this status who disconnect from any worldly objects and become free of all cravings and desires. From this aspect of Hinduism, vegetarianism was naturally and smoothly rooted in the cultural cuisine and modest vegetarian diet in India.

Estimates and Statistics

CNN-IBN State of the Nation Survey, 2008 
According to a 2006 Hindu-CNN-IBN State of the Nation Survey, 31% of Indians are vegetarian, while another 9% also consume eggs (ovo-vegetarian). Among the various communities, vegetarianism was most common among the Swaminarayan community, Brahmins, Arya Samaj community, Lingayats, Vaishnavites, Jains, Sikhs and, less frequent among Muslims (3%) and residents of coastal states. However, other surveys cited by FAO and USDA estimate 40% of the Indian population as being vegetarian. These surveys indicate that even Indians who do eat meat, do so infrequently, with less than 30% consuming it regularly, although the reasons are mainly cultural.

Economic and Political Weekly, 2018 

A 2018 study from Economic and Political Weekly by US-based anthropologist Balmurli Natrajan and India-based economist Suraj Jacob suggests that these numbers could be inflated by social reluctance to admit to meat consumption and estimates that the percentage of vegetarians is likely closer to 20% than 30% overall, with the percentage varying by household income and caste. The study argues that meat-eating behavior is underreported because consumption of meat, especially beef, is "caught in cultural, political, and group identity struggles in India".

According to a 2018 survey released by the registrar general of India, Rajasthan (74.9%), Haryana (69.25%), Punjab (66.75%), and Gujarat (60.95%) have the highest percentage of vegetarians, followed by Madhya Pradesh (50.6%), Uttar Pradesh (47.1%), Maharashtra (40.2%), Delhi (39.5%), Uttarakhand (27.35%), Karnataka (21.1%), Assam (20.6%), Chhattisgarh (17.95%), Bihar (7.55%), Jharkhand (3.25%), Kerala (3.0%), Odisha (2.65%), Tamil Nadu (2.35%), Andhra Pradesh (1.75%), West Bengal (1.4%), and Telangana (1.3%).

Various studies conducted by the Government of India 
An official survey conducted by the Government of India, with a sample size of 8858 and the census frame as 2011, indicated India's vegetarian population to be 28–29% of the total population. Compared to a similar survey done in 2004, India's vegetarian population has increased, although according to conflicting data from the National Family Health Survey in 2015–2016 (NFHS), the share of vegetarianism has declined compared to data from 2005 to 2006. Increases in meat consumption in India have been attributed to urbanisation, increasing disposable income, consumerism and cross-cultural influences.

In 2022, the National Health and Family Survey (NHFS) released its fifth survey results (2019–2021) which reiterated the hypothesis of a sizeable section of nutrition scholars that the number of Indians who are non-vegetarian has been increasing steadily. It also found significant gender disparities in the consumption of solely vegetarian food.

Pew Research Center, 2021 
In 2021, Pew Research Center released the results of a survey of over 29,999 Indians throughout the country which included questions on dietary preferences. According to this study, around 39% of the overall Indian population identifies as vegetarian (the survey did not specify a type of vegetarianism and left the definition of the term up to the respondent). In terms of religion, Jains were found to be the most vegetarian at 92%, followed by Sikhs (59%), Hindus (44%), Buddhists (25%), Christians (10%), and finally Muslims (8%). Among Hindus, however, there are wide regional variations with regard to the percentage of people identifying as vegetarian, with 71% of North Indian Hindus identifying as vegetarian, followed by 61% of Central Indians, 57% of West Indians, 30% of South Indians, 19% of Northeast Indians, and 18% of East Indians identifying as vegetarian. There are also caste differences in rates of vegetarianism, with 40% of lower caste Hindus identifying as vegetarian compared to 53% for general category Hindus. Hindus who considered religion very important in their lives identified as vegetarian 46% of the time compared to 33% for those who said it was less important.

Southeastern

Malaysia

Vegetarian diets are categorized as lacto vegetarianism, ovo-lacto vegetarianism, and veganism in general. The reasons for being vegetarian include influence from friends and family members, concern about global warming, health issues and weight management, religion and mercy for animals, in descending order of significance.

Singapore

Rice, mushrooms, vegetables are some of the dietary staples, mixed with a rich variety of spices, coconut, lime and tamarind. Buddhist Chinese monastics are vegetarians or vegans. Singapore is also the headquarters of the world's first international, vegetarian, fast food chain, VeganBurg. The bigger communities of vegetarians and vegans in Singapore are Vegetarian Society (VSS) and SgVeganCommunity. Vegetarian and vegan places have an active role in the gastronomy of Singapore.

Thailand

There are more than 908 vegetarian eating establishments in Thailand.

Western

Israel 

A study by the Israeli Ministry of Health in 2001 found that 7.2% of men and 9.8% of women were vegetarian. Although vegetarianism is quite common, the actual percentage of vegetarians in Israel may be lower—the Israeli food industry estimated it at 5%. In 2010, one study found that 2.6% of Israelis were vegetarians or vegans.

According to a 2015 poll by the newspaper Globes and Channel 2, 8% of the Israeli population were vegetarians and 5% were vegans. 13% consider turning vegan or vegetarian. Tel Aviv beat out Berlin, New York and Chennai as U.S. food website The Daily Meal's top destination for vegan travelers.

Jewish vegan and vegetarian population has contributed to promotion of meat-free and animal-product-free cultures within Israel through various platforms.

Some argue that the practicing and learning Judaism would lead a person to adopt vegetarianism or veganism.

Europe
The definition of vegetarianism throughout Europe is not uniform, creating the potential for products to be labelled inaccurately. Throughout Europe the use of non-vegetarian ingredients are found in products such as beer (isinglass among others), wine (gelatine and crustacean shells among others) and cheese (rennet).

Belgium 
Since May 2009, Belgium has had the first city in the world (Ghent) with a weekly "veggie day".

A study that surveyed 2,436 Belgian individuals found that "21.8% of the respondents believed that meat consumption is unhealthy, and 45.6% of the respondents believed that they should eat less meat." The major reasons persons expressed interest in a more plant-based diet was for taste and health-related reasons. The majority of vegetarians polled think that the meat industry is harmful to the planet, while more than half of the non-vegetarians surveyed disagree with this statement.

Finland 
In some cities' schools in Finland, the students are offered two options, a vegetarian and a non-vegetarian meal, on four school days a week, and one day a week they have a choice between two vegetarian meals, for grades 1 to 12. In secondary schools and universities, from 10 to 40 percent of the students preferred vegetarian food in 2013. Vegetarianism is most popular in secondary art schools where in some schools over half of the students were vegetarians in 2013.

France 
In France lunches at public schools must contain a "minimum of 20% of meals containing meat and 20% containing fish, and the remainder containing egg, cheese, or offal. However, under a law called "loi Egalim", which passed in 2018 and came into effect in November 2019, all French schools are required to serve at least one meat-free meal a week. In September 2020, 73% of French nurseries and elementary schools offer at least one meat-free meal a week, according to a recent investigation by Greenpeace.

An Appetite study found that French women were more accepting of vegetarianism than French men.

There has been conflict between vegans and farmers in southern France. A farmers' union known as "Coordination Rurale" advocated for the French to continue eating meat through the slogan "To save a peasant farmer, eat a vegan."

Germany 
In 1889, the first "International Veg Congress" met in Cologne, Germany.

In 2016, Germany was found to have the highest percentage of vegetarians (7.8 million, 10%) and vegans (900,000, 1.1%) in the modern West. A survey from "Forsa" also revealed that approximately 42 million people in Germany identify as flexitarians aka "part time vegetarians". Professionals at the German Official Agencies estimate that by 2020 over 20% of Germans will eat mostly vegetarian. The reason vegetarianism is so prevalent in Germany is not agreed upon, but the movement seems to have experienced much growth from promotion in media and the offering of more non-meat options.

Hungary 
The recorded history of vegetarianism in the country began with the Hungarian Vegetarian Society (HVS), formed in 1883. During this time, vegetarianism was popular because New Age ideas and counter belief systems were favored. In 1911, the first Hungarian vegetarian restaurant opened up in Vámház körút. In the 1950s, the HVS ceased operations and vegetarianism in popular culture diminished. Hungarian vegetarianism was later revived in 1989 with the fall of socialism. The "Ahimsa Hungarian Vegetarian Society of Veszprém" was founded in the late 90s.

Iceland 
According to Iceland Monitor in 2016, Iceland had more vegetarian restaurants registered on HappyCow per capita than any other country in Europe.

Ireland 
While meat and dairy products have traditionally featured prominently in the Irish diet, vegetarianism and veganism have experienced rapid growth in recent decades. In 2018, a study by Bord Bia, a state agency which seeks to support and promote the country's agriculture industry, found that as many as 5.1% of the Irish population are now vegetarian, and up to 3.5% are vegan. A further 10% were described as some form of flexitarian, meaning that they still consumed some meat and dairy products but sought to minimize the amount of animal products in their diet. Participants identified a range of motivators for their dietary choices, but personal health and wellness and environmental concerns were among the most common factors cited.

Netherlands 
It was reported in 2006 that sales of meat substitutes had an annual growth of around 25%, which made it one of the fastest-growing markets in the Netherlands. In supermarkets and stores, it is sometimes necessary to read the fine print on products in order to make sure that there are no animal-originated ingredients. Increasingly, however, vegetarian products are labeled with the international "V-label", overseen by the Dutch vegetarian association .

In a late 2019 study published by the environmental organization  ("Stichting Nature and Environment"), 59% of Dutch adults (age 16 and up) described themselves as a "meat eater" while 37% responded that they were flexitarians. 43% of respondents claimed that they ate less meat than they did four years earlier. Furthermore, almost half (47%) agreed with or agreed strongly with the statement that eating meat is an outdated practice. In their surveys, 2% identified as vegetarian, 2% as pescetarian and <1% as vegan.

Of this number, 2% called themselves "vegetarian" while some 1% labeled themselves as vegan. The remaining 1–3% was pescetarian.

In July 2020 the  estimated the number of vegans in the Netherlands at 150,000. That is approximately 0.9% of the Dutch population.

Poland 
The capital of Poland, Warsaw, was listed 6th on the list of Top Vegan Cities in the World published by HappyCow in 2019.

Portugal 
In 2007, the number of vegetarians in Portugal was estimated at 30,000; which is equal to less than 0.3% of the population. In 2014, the number was estimated to be 200,000 people. Vegan and vegetarian products like soy milk, soy yogurts, rice milk and tofu are widely available in major retailers, and sold across the country. According to HappyCow, Lisbon is the 6th city in the world for number of vegan restaurants per capita, more than any other European city.

Romania
Followers of the Romanian Orthodox Church keep fasts during several periods in the ecclesiastical calendar amounting to a majority of the year. In the Romanian Orthodox tradition, devotees keep to a diet without any animal products during these times. As a result, vegan foods are abundant in stores and restaurants; however, Romanians may not be familiar with a vegan or vegetarian diet as a full-time lifestyle choice.

Russia
Vegetarianism in Russia first gained prominence in 1901 with the opening of the first vegetarian society in St. Petersburg. Vegetarianism began to largely grow after the collapse of the Soviet Union in 1991. Russian vegetarians were found to be mainly those who were wealthy and educated.

Spain 
The number of restaurants and food stores catering exclusively, or partially, to vegetarians and vegans has more than doubled since 2011; with a total of 800 on record by the end of 2016, The Green Revolution claims.

Switzerland 
According to Agriculture and Agri-Food Canada, Switzerland has the second highest rate of vegetarianism in the European Union (though in fact Switzerland is not in the EU). Older governmental data from 1997 suggest that 2.3% of the population never eat meat and the observed trend seemed to point towards less meat consumption. Newer studies suggest that the percentage of vegetarians has risen to 5% by 2007. According to a 2020 survey by Swissveg, there were 5.1% vegetarians and 1% vegans.

United Kingdom 
The Vegetarian Society was formed in Britain in 1847. In 1944, a faction split from the group to form The Vegan Society.

A 2018 study by comparethemarket.com found that approximately 7% of British people were vegan, while 14% were vegetarian. The results of this study however are questioned by the UK Vegan Society who found that the sample was based on only 2,000 people. According to The Vegan Society's larger survey, the number of vegans quadrupled from 2014 to 2018; in 2018 there were approximately 600,000 vegans in the UK, equivalent to 1.16% of the British population as a whole. As well as this, 31% are eating less meat—either for health or ethical reasons, and 19% are eating fewer dairy products.

A 2021 YouGov survey found 8% of respondents said they followed a plant-based diet, and over a third are interested in becoming vegan.

Participation in Veganuary has become increasingly popular, with the number of people signing up rising each year.

North America

Canada
In Canada, vegetarianism is on the rise. A 2018 survey conducted by Dalhousie University researcher Sylvain Charlebois found that 9.4% of Canadian adults considered themselves either vegetarian or vegan. This included 2.3 million vegetarians (7.1% of Canada's population), up from 900,000 15 years prior, and 850,000 vegans (2.3% of Canada's population). As the majority of Canada's vegetarians are under 35, the rate of vegetarianism is expected to continue to rise.

United States
In 1971, 1% of U.S. citizens described themselves as vegetarians. In 2009 Harris Interactive found that 3.4% are vegetarian and 0.8% vegan. U.S. vegetarian food sales (dairy replacements such as soy milk and meat replacements such as textured vegetable protein) doubled between 1998 and 2003, reaching $1.6 billion in 2003. In 2015, a Harris Poll National Survey of 2,017 adults aged 18 and over found that eight million Americans, or 3.4%, ate a solely vegetarian diet, and that one million, or 0.4%, ate a strictly vegan diet. A 2018 Gallup poll estimated that 5% of U.S. adults consider themselves to be vegetarians. Older Americans were less likely to be vegetarian with just 2% of adults aged 55 and older saying they follow a vegetarian diet. Younger generations of Americans are more likely to be vegetarian with 7% of 35- to 54-year-olds and 8% of 18- to 34-year-olds following a vegetarian diet.

Many American children whose parents follow vegetarian diets follow them because of religious, environmental or other reasons. In the government's first estimate of how many children avoid meat, the number is about 1 in 200. The CDC survey included children ages 0 to 17 years.

By U.S. law, food packaging is regulated by the Food and Drug Administration, and generally must be labeled with a list of all its ingredients. However, there are exceptions. For example, certain trace ingredients that are "ingredients of ingredients" do not need to be listed.

Oceania

Australia
In Australia, some manufacturers who target the vegetarian market label their foods with the statement "suitable for vegetarians"; however, for foods intended for export to the UK, this labelling can be inconsistent because flavourings in ingredients lists do not need to specify if they come from animal origin. As such, "natural flavour" could be derived from either plant or animal sources.

Animal rights organisations such as Animal Liberation promote vegan and vegetarian diets. "Vegetarian Week" runs from 1–7 October every year, and food companies are taking advantage of the growing number of vegetarians by producing meat-free alternatives of popular dishes, including sausages and mash and spaghetti Bolognese.

A 2000 Newspoll survey (commissioned by Sanitarium) shows 44% of Australians report eating at least one meat-free evening meal a week, while 18% said they prefer plant-based meals.

New Zealand
Similar to Australia, in New Zealand the term "vegetarian" refers to individuals who eat no animal meat such as pork, chicken, and fish; they may consume animal products such as milk and eggs. In contrast, the term "vegan" is used to describe those who do not eat or use any by-products of animals. In 2002 New Zealand's vegetarians made up a minority of 1–2% of the country's 4.5 million people. By 2011 Roy Morgan Research claimed the number of New Zealanders eating an "all or almost all" vegetarian diet to be 8.1%, growing to 10.3% in 2015 (with men providing the most growth, up 63% from 5.7% to 9.3%). In New Zealand there is a strong enough movement for vegetarianism that it has created significant enough demand for a number of vegetarian and vegan retailers to set up.

As New Zealand and Australia work together to form common food standards (as seen in the Food Standards Australia New Zealand (FSANZ) and the Australia New Zealand Food Standards Code), there is also a lot of ambiguity surrounding the "natural flavour" ingredients.

Latin America 
According to a Nielsen survey on food preferences from 2016, vegetarians make up 8% and vegans 4% of the population across Latin America, with the highest numbers of both in Mexico.

Brazil
In 2004, Marly Winckler, President of the Brazilian Vegetarian Society, claimed that 5% of the population was vegetarian. According to a 2012 survey undertaken by the Brazilian Institute of Public Opinion and Statistics, 8% of the population, or 15.2 million people, identified themselves as vegetarian. The city of São Paulo had the most vegetarians in absolute terms (792,120 people), while Fortaleza had the highest percentage, at 14% of the total population. A new survey undertaken by the Brazilian Institute of Public Opinion and Statistics in 2018 showed that the proportion of the population identifying as vegetarian grew to 14% (a 75% increase relative to 2012), representing 29 million people. According to the New York Times, the number of vegetarians in Brazil, the world's largest meat exporter, has nearly doubled in just six years.

Marly Winckler claims that the central reasons for the deforestation of the Amazon are expansive livestock raising (mainly cattle) and soybean crops, most of it for use as animal feed, and a minor percentage for edible oil processing (being direct human consumption for use as food nearly negligible), claims that are widely known to have a basis.

 is usually synonymous with lacto-ovo-vegetarianism, and vegetarians are sometimes wrongly assumed to be pescetarians and/or pollotarians who tolerate the flesh of fish or poultry, respectively. Nevertheless, veganism, and freeganism, have now become mainstream in the country, being present in nearly every family. Brazilian vegetarians reportedly tend to be urban, of middle or upper class and live in the Central-Southern half of the country. Since the 1990s, and especially since the 2010s, hundreds of vegan and vegetarian restaurants have appeared in the major cities of the country.

Argentina

In Argentina, it is estimated that around 1% to 2% of the population practice vegetarianism.

See also
 List of vegetarian festivals
 List of vegetarian organizations
List of countries with vegan school meals

Notes

References

External links
 Top 5 Vegan Friendly Cities